Torsten Spanneberg (born 13 April 1975 in Halle, Saxony-Anhalt) is an Olympic medal winning German swimmer. He won the bronze medal in the 4×100 m medley relay at the 2000 Summer Olympics and participated in the swimming at the 2004 Summer Olympics. His trainer is Norbert Warnatzach and his club is S.G. Neukölln. , Spanneberg is a student and is 2.02 metres tall and weighs 88 kilograms.

References

1975 births
German male swimmers
Living people
Sportspeople from Halle (Saale)
Olympic swimmers of Germany
Swimmers at the 2000 Summer Olympics
Swimmers at the 2004 Summer Olympics
Olympic bronze medalists for Germany
Olympic bronze medalists in swimming
German male freestyle swimmers
World Aquatics Championships medalists in swimming
Medalists at the FINA World Swimming Championships (25 m)
European Aquatics Championships medalists in swimming
Medalists at the 2000 Summer Olympics
20th-century German people
21st-century German people